Sora-myeon, also called as Sora Township, or shortly Sora, is a myeon (township) in Yeosu city of South Jeolla Province, South Korea. The myeon is located in center-western part of the city. The total area of the myeon is 60.5 square kilometres, and, as of the last day of 2010, the population was 12256 people, 5195 houses. The township hall is located in Deogyang-ri, and address of the township hall is 389, Deogyang-ro, Sora-myeon. Hwayang-myeon is souther and Yulchon-myeon, is norther, Samil-dong and the Gwangyang Bay is north-Easter,  Jusam-dong and Yeocheon-dong is Easter, Ssangbong-dong is south-Easter, and the Yeoja Bay is western.

History 
 1899: Gusan-myeon (Northern part) and Deogan-myeon (Southern part)
 1915: Sora-myeon, Yeosu-gun, Jeollanam-do
 15 August 1949: Sora-myeon, Yeocheon-gun, Jeollanam-do: Yeosu-gun was split into Yeosu-si and Yeocheon-gun.
 1 April 1998: Sora-myeon, Yeosu-si, Jeollanam-do: Yeosu-si, Yeocheon-si, and Yeocheon-gun were merged to Yeosu-si.

Ri 
It has eight jurisdictions and forty two administrative districts.

Gwangi-ri 
Gwangi-ri has three administrative districts: Gwangi(관기)1~3.

Daepo-ri 
Daepo-ri has four administrative districts: Daepo(대포)1~4. It has Daepo Tunnel with Yulchon-myeon on the Expo-daero.

Deogyang-ri 
Deogyang-ri has six administrative districts: Deogyang(덕양)1~6. It has Sora township hall. It has Deogyang Station on Jeolla Line and on Yeocheon Line. It has Deogyang Intersection on Expo-daero, Yeosun-ro and Deogyang-ro.

Boksan-ri 
Boksan-ri has six administrative districts: Boksan(복산)1~6.

Bongdu-ri 
Bongdu-ri has three administrative districts: Bongdu(봉두)1~3.

Sagok-ri 
Sagok-ri has four administrative districts: Sagok(사곡)1~4.

Jungnim-ri 
Jungnim-ri has thirteen administrative districts: Jungnim(죽림)1~13.

Hyeoncheon-ri 
Hyeoncheon-ri has three administrative districts: Hyeoncheon(현천)1~3.

Transport 
It has Deogyang Station on the Jeolla Line and the Yeocheon Line in Deogyang-ri, and address of it is 56, Yeosun-ro. It has a motorway named Expo-daero, the part of the National Route 17 and the part of the Gukjido 22, is located in Deogyang-ri and Daepo-ri. You can go in or out to this motorway at the Deogyang Intersection, the entrance and the exit of Expo-daero, in Deogyang-ri by using Yeosun-ro or Deogyang-ro. Hwayang-ro, Dowon-ro and Deogyang-ro are the part of the Gukjido 22, too. Okcheon-ro, Hwayang-ro and Seobu-ro are the part of the Jibangdo 863. It has also Yeosun-ro, former part of the National Route 17.

References

External links 
 여수시 소라면사무소 

Yeosu
Towns and townships in South Jeolla Province